Martinovići may refer to:
 Martinovići, Sisak-Moslavina County, a settlement in Glina, Croatia
 Martinovići, Gusinje, Montenegro